Amarillo High School is a school located in the city of Amarillo, Texas, United States and is one of four high schools in the Amarillo Independent School District and classified as a 5A school by the University Interscholastic League (UIL). In 2015, the school was rated "Met Standard" by the Texas Education Agency.

History 
Founded in 1889, Amarillo High School began in a converted courthouse which was outgrown and abandoned that same year. Moving to a larger building on Polk street served the schools needs until 1906 and yet another building was utilized until 1910.

Construction of a permanent home was completed in 1910, also on Polk street near downtown.  A much larger facility was completed nearby in 1922, and this facility was in use until a fire destroyed the entire school except for the gym in 1970.

Amarillo High School fire 
Early in the morning of March 1, 1970, a Sunday, J.B. Putney, a custodian at First Baptist Church, traveled to work and saw the fire inside the school. He was the first person to report the blaze at 6:15 a.m. A fire raged through the building. It first began in a second story storeroom, caused by an overheated boiler below, and soon spread to damage nearly all of the structure and destroy most of the property inside. Several courageous students arrived on the scene first and began removing textbooks, trophies, class gifts, art pieces and other artifacts from the burning building. Fortunately, no one was injured in the fire. The damage was estimated at the time to be nearly 2 million dollars.

The approximately 1,700 Amarillo High School students spent the remainder of the year in makeshift classes set up in the facilities of the First Baptist Church and the Polk Street Methodist Church and the undamaged school gymnasiums and armory. The experience created a bond among the students, who were grateful not to be farmed out to another high schools in the area. Renovations in the burned out building accommodated students for the next three years until a new high school could be built.

Extracurricular activities

Music
One of the musical groups of AHS during the 1950s was the "Sandie Swingsters" who played for pep rallies, dances and other special events at AHS. Currently, the AHS Band performs at pep rallies, games, and other events. (N.B.: The first 'swing' band at AHS was actually called the "Dukes of Sandieland".  It was formed in 1958 under the direction of William O. Latson.)

Since then, the school has supported three string orchestras, two wind bands, a marching ensemble, and a combined orchestra.

Clubs
Amarillo High School offers many diverse activities, in foreign languages, fine arts, community services, and athletics, including Drama Club, Student Council, Spanish Club, Latin Club, French Club, band, orchestra, choir, Key Club, Ken Club, Junior Statesmen of America, National Honor Society, FCCLA, Math Club, Science Bowl, International Forum, Soccer, football, baseball, swimming, bowling, golf, wrestling, Frisbee Club, Shirt Club, and other curricular and extracurricular activities.

Athletics
The Amarillo Golden Sandstorm football program has one of the best early traditions in Texas. Beginning in 1922, Amarillo High has made 46 football playoff appearances, which is second only to 5A Dallas Highland Park. Amarillo High emerged as a football powerhouse in the 1930s as young head coach Blair Cherry guided the Sandies to three consecutive Texas state championships in 1934–1936, as only the second school to ever do so (the Paul Tyson-guided Waco won 1925–27). Cherry left Amarillo in 1937 to become offensive coordinator under Dana X. Bible at the University of Texas. His successor Howard Lynch struggled to handle the task of fulfilling the high expectations, although he won another state championship in 1940 and reach the championship game in 1948. The school chose not to renew Lynch's contract in 1951.

Lynch's successor, Bill Defee, had previously coached at Panola College. Defee left in 1955, being replaced by Joe Kerbel, who had previously won two state championships at Breckenridge High. Kerbel, in three years, guided the Sandies to the playoffs 2 times. The 1957 team was ranked #1 in the state all year long until they lost in the quarterfinals to defending state champion, Abilene High School. That game drew over 22,000 fans, the largest ever to watch a football game in Amarillo Stadium, (Now Dick Bivins Stadium) . Kerbel left to become an assistant coach at Texas Tech and later was the head coach at West Texas State University.

After that, there was a string of unsuccessful stints by a number of coaches. Amarillo High went 16 years, 1960–1975, without gaining the playoffs. Bum Phillips, who would later become the Houston Oilers head coach, coached Amarillo at the beginning of that drought, from 1959 to 1961. In 1975, Larry Dippel arrived, turning the program around and guiding the Sandies to 222 wins until 2005. Dippel took over an Amarillo High program in 1975 that was struggling. AHS had not been in the playoffs since 1959 but Dippel turned around the program and led AHS to 23 playoff appearances.  After the 2005 season (31 seasons), Dippel retired.  He finished his career with a record of 253-134-6, with 222 of the wins coming with the Sandies.  His many honors include being named 2003 National Coach of the year, serving as president of the Texas High School Coaches Association in 1999 and being named state coach of the year (The Tom Landry Award) in 1993. Dippel also earned the Sportsmanship Award from Amarillo Football Officials four times.  Dippel's tenure as a head coach at Amarillo High is the longest of any head coach in any sport in AISD history. He won 16 district titles at Hereford and AHS combined, and he led the Sandies to the Class 5A state semifinals in 1992. Dippel leaves having coached fathers and sons, uncles and nephews.

Amarillo ISD athletic director Tex Nolan selected Brad Thiessen to be Dippel's successor. Thiessen had previously coached at 1A Stratford High and 3A Levelland High. He guided Stratford to a 16–0 season and the 1A state championship in 2000. The Stratford 2001 football team ran their unbeaten string to 30 games before losing in the semi-finals, ending a 17–1 season.

The Amarillo Sandies compete in these sports - 

Volleyball, Cross Country, Football, Basketball, Wrestling, Swimming, Soccer, Golf, Tennis, Track, Baseball & Softball

State Titles
Boys Basketball - 
1986(5A)
Girls Basketball - 
1993(5A), 1994(5A), 2018(5A), 2019(5A)
Girls Cross Country - 
1976(1A), 1977(1A), 1998(5A)
Football - 
1934(All), 1935(All), 1936(All), 1940(All)
Boys Golf - 
1954(2A)
Volleyball - 
1988(5A), 1994(5A), 1998(5A), 2001(5A), 2006(5A), 2007(5A), 2008(5A), 2009(5A), 2013(4A), 2016(5A)

State Finalists
Football -   
1930(All), 1948(2A); 
Volleyball - 
1986(5A), 1997(5A)
Tennis (Team) -
2017(5A)

Hell Week
Hell week, also referred to as "Spirit Week" is the week in which Amarillo High plays its annual football game against Tascosa High School, its traditional rival. During Hell Week, vandalism is commonplace, such as egging, spraypainting, toilet papering, keying, and other property defacing acts. In 2006, vandalism ranged from simple chalking on sidewalks to bricks being thrown through windows. In 2007, fellow Senior Sandies of 08' spray-painted the black "T" in front of Tascosa gold. However, many steps are being taken to attempt to make Hell Week less violent, such as increased police presence. Both schools also discourage violence during announcements.
Amarillo High School has won many of the games, including 2010 for the district championship, but they had a notable loss in 2009, losing by a field goal. Amarillo High continued their tradition of winning until the 2016 matching, when Tascosa posted a grieving 23–21 win over Amarillo High with a late 4th quarter touchdown with only 36 seconds left on the clock.
Since 1975, Amarillo High owns the series record 32-10-2.

School Colors 
Gold, White, Black.

Notable alumni

Carl Birdsong, player for the St. Louis Cardinals
Ron Ely, actor Tarzan television show and former Miss America host
Lt. General Howard D. Graves, Superintendent of the United States Military Academy (1991–1996), and Chancellor of the Texas A&M University System (1999–2003)
Heath Herring, football player and wrestler; retired mixed martial artist fighter for the Ultimate Fighting Championship
Rick Husband NASA Astronaut, Pilot of STS 96, and Commander of STS 107
Tung Jeong, physicist
Carolyn Jones, actress on The Addams Family
Steven Koecher, Utah man missing since 2009
Stan Mauldin, former player for the Chicago Cardinals
Trina Nishimura, voice actress
Morris Overstreet, judge 
Ryan Palmer, professional PGA golf player
T. Boone Pickens, Jr., billionaire and oil tycoon
Eddie Reeves, Singer/Songwriter
Ben Sargent, Editorial Cartoonist
Greg Jackson, Chicago White Sox, Owner of Plaksa
Teri Rogers, stage and voice actor

References

External links
 
 Amarillo ISD

Educational institutions established in 1889
Public high schools in Texas
Amarillo Independent School District
Schools in Potter County, Texas
1889 establishments in Texas